Kladruby may refer to places in the Czech Republic:

Kladruby (Benešov District), a municipality and village in the Central Bohemian Region
Kladruby (Rokycany District), a municipality and village in the Plzeň Region
Kladruby (Strakonice District), a municipality and village in the South Bohemian Region
Kladruby (Tachov District), a town in the Plzeň Region
Kladruby (Teplice District), a municipality and village in the Ústí nad Labem Region
Kladruby nad Labem, a municipality and village in the Pardubice Region
Ovesné Kladruby, a municipality and village in the Karlovy Vary Region

See also
Kladeruby
Kladeruby nad Oslavou
Kladruber